Donald B. Redfern (born June 9, 1945) is an American politician in the state of Iowa.

Redfern was born in Nebraska City, Nebraska. He attended Carleton College and Columbia University Law School and is a lawyer. He served Iowa Senate from 1991 to 2004, as a Republican (12th district from 1993 to 2003 and 10th district from 2003 to 2005).

Redfern's unsuccessful 1988 Congressional run is discussed in Chinese political theorist Wang Huning's seminal book America Against America as an example of the dynamics of U.S. political campaign.

References

1945 births
Living people
People from Nebraska City, Nebraska
Carleton College alumni
Columbia Law School alumni
Iowa lawyers
Republican Party Iowa state senators